Vala In London is a 2003 Sri Lankan Sinhalese comedy film directed by Hemasiri Sellapperuma and produced by T. Quintus Peiris for NS Films. It stars Ranjan Ramanayake, Tennyson Cooray, and Sabeetha Perera in lead roles along with Wilson Karunaratne and Freddie Silva. Music composed by Sarath Dassanayake. It is the 971st Sri Lankan film in the Sinhalese cinema.

Plot

Cast
 Ranjan Ramanayake as Suranga
 Tennyson Cooray as Valentine 'Vala' / Professor Surpentine
 Sabeetha Perera as Nayomi
 Uresha Geethanjali as Gayomi
 Wilson Karunaratne as Gajasinghe
 Freddie Silva as Charlie
 Manel Chandralatha as Sobani
 Teddy Vidyalankara as Gajasinghe's son
 Gemunu Wijesuriya as Helped slumdweller's husband
 Sunil Hettiarachchi as Vala's father
 Berty Gunathilake as Gajasinghe's servant

Soundtrack

References

2003 films
2000s Sinhala-language films